Sergio Brusin is the former Principal Expert Response and Emergency Operations at the European Centre for Disease Prevention and Control.
He developed the ECDC infectious disease risk assessment methodology that is used by ECDC and other public health institutions in assessing the risk posed by communicable disease events.
He advocated for far fewer travel restrictions during the COVID-19 pandemic recommending to concentrate the response efforts to stricter domestic control measures strongly enforced.

He is currently the Head of the MedCOI Sector at the European Asylum Support Office

References

External links 
https://www.researchgate.net/profile/Sergio_Brusin

Living people
Year of birth missing (living people)